Divisaderos Municipality is a municipality in Sonora in north-western Mexico.

The area of the municipality is 617.69 km2. and the population was 681 inhabitants in 2005, a decrease from the 825 inhabitants counted in the 2000 census.

References

Municipalities of Sonora